Donald Edward Whelden (December 28, 1954 – June 3, 1985) was a professional ice hockey defenseman who played two games for the St. Louis Blues in the 1974–75 NHL season. He was born in Falmouth, Massachusetts.

Whelden was killed on June 3, 1985 when a bolt of lightning hit a tree outside the home and broke a window above the head of his bed. His wife Linda was at his side and survived the tragic incident.

References

External links

1954 births
1985 deaths
American men's ice hockey defensemen
Columbus Owls players
Denver Spurs players
Ice hockey players from Massachusetts
Indianapolis Racers draft picks
London Knights players
People from Falmouth, Massachusetts
St. Louis Blues draft picks
St. Louis Blues players
Winston-Salem Polar Twins (SHL) players